The Viva Las Vengeance Tour was the final concert tour by American pop rock solo project Panic! at the Disco. The tour supports the project's seventh studio album Viva Las Vengeance, and visited North America and Europe. The tour began on September 8, 2022, at the Moody Center in Austin, Texas, and concluded on March 10, 2023, at the AO Arena in Manchester, England. The tour was promoted by Live Nation Entertainment and Crush Management. 

On January 24, 2023, Urie announced that Panic! would be discontinued following the end of the tour, in order to focus on his family.

Set list 
This set list is representative of the show on February 20, 2023 in Vienna, Austria and may not be representative of all shows on the tour.

 "Say Amen (Saturday Night)"
 "Hey Look Ma, I Made It"
 "Don't Threaten Me with a Good Time"
 "This Is Gospel"
 "Miss Jackson"
 "Emperor's New Clothes"
 "Viva Las Vengeance"
 "Middle of a Breakup"
 "Don't Let the Light Go Out"
 "Local God"
 "Star Spangled Banger"
 "God Killed Rock and Roll"
 "Say It Louder"
 "Sugar Soaker"
 "Something About Maggie"
 "Sad Clown"
 "All by Yourself"
 "Do It to Death"
 "Girls / Girls / Boys"
 "House of Memories"
 "Nine in the Afternoon"
 "Death of a Bachelor"
 "I Write Sins Not Tragedies"
 "Victorious"
 "High Hopes"

Tour dates

Cancelled dates

References 

2022 concert tours
2023 concert tours
Concert tours of North America
Concert tours of the United States
Concert tours of Europe
Concert tours of the United Kingdom
Concert tours of France
Concert tours of Germany
Farewell concert tours